Saint-Brieuc Armor Agglomération is the communauté d'agglomération, an intercommunal structure, centred on the city of Saint-Brieuc. It is located in the Côtes-d'Armor department, in the Brittany region, western France. It was created in January 2017. Its seat is in Saint-Brieuc. Its population was 151,733 in 2017, of which 44,372 in Saint-Brieuc proper.

Composition
The communauté d'agglomération consists of the following 32 communes:

Binic-Étables-sur-Mer
Le Bodéo
Le Fœil
Hillion
La Harmoye
Lanfains
Langueux
Lantic
Le Leslay
La Méaugon
Plaine-Haute
Plaintel
Plédran
Plérin
Plœuc-l'Hermitage
Ploufragan
Plourhan
Pordic
Quintin
Saint-Bihy
Saint-Brandan
Saint-Brieuc
Saint-Carreuc
Saint-Donan
Saint-Gildas
Saint-Julien
Saint-Quay-Portrieux
Trégueux
Trémuson
Tréveneuc
Le Vieux-Bourg
Yffiniac

References

Saint-Brieuc Armor
Saint-Brieuc Armor